Barbara Mervin (born April 1, 1982) is a Canadian rugby union player also known affectionately as Swevin Mervin. She represented  at the 2014 Women's Rugby World Cup. She broke a bone in her right hand in 's first World Cup match against  and missed out on the rest of the World Cup in France. Mervin was a member of the Canadian sevens team that won the 2012 Las Vegas Sevens.

Mervin graduated from the University of Western Ontario with a Bachelor's degree in art history and she also has a diploma in fashion design from the Pacific Design Academy in Victoria, British Columbia.

Mervin coaches the University of Victoria Vikes. She also founded a clothesline company called Aptoella Rugby Apparel.

Honours
 2005 CIS National Player of the Year
 CIS Rookie of the Year Award
 CIS National Champion x2

References

External links
 Rugby Canada Player Profile 
 

1982 births
Living people
Canadian female rugby union players
Canada women's international rugby union players
Female rugby sevens players
University of Western Ontario alumni
Sportspeople from St. John's, Newfoundland and Labrador